The Secrétariat du Conseil du trésor (English: Treasury Board Secretariat) is a government department in the Canadian provincial Government of Quebec. Its primary function is to assist the Treasury Board and its chair in the function of government and the management of resources.

The ministry is divided into four sub-secretariats: budget policies and programs, public service personnel, remuneration policies and intersectorial coordination of negotiations, and public procurement.

The secretariat is overseen by the president of the Treasury Board, who is a member of the Executive Council of Quebec. The current president is Christian Dubé.

External links
Website of the Secrétariat du Conseil du trésor

References

Quebec government departments and agencies